James North House, also known as The House, is a historic home located at Labadie, Franklin County, Missouri. It was built about 1819, and is a two-story, central passage plan, frame I-house.  It is five bays wide and has a one-story front porch on stone piers.

It was listed on the National Register of Historic Places in 1984.

References

Houses on the National Register of Historic Places in Missouri
Farms on the National Register of Historic Places in Missouri
Houses completed in 1860
Buildings and structures in Franklin County, Missouri
National Register of Historic Places in Franklin County, Missouri